Antenne Centre Télévision (English: Television Center Antenna) (ACTV) is a Belgian television channel, broadcast in eleven municipalities in the Centre Region. It is one of the twelve local televisions recognized in the French Community Wallonia-Brussels.

History 
The channel was founded in 1982.

In 2019, the station survived financial problems.

Personalities

Former 

 Florence Reuter

References 

French-language television networks
Television networks in Belgium
1982 establishments in Belgium
Television channels and stations established in 1982
Mass media in Brussels
Television channels in Belgium